The Opium Clerk is a 2001 novel written by Kunal Basu about the effects of the Eastern opium trade on three generations of an Anglo-Indian “family”. While the novel is nominally about the opium trade it also tells the story of the British trading presence in China and Southeast Asia from the perspective of one of the Indian employees.

See also 

 Ibis trilogy

References

2001 novels
Fiction set in 1857
Works about opium